The 2012 FIL European Luge Championships took place under the auspices of the International Luge Federation at Paramonovo, Russia from 25 to 26 February 2012.

Medalists

Medal table

References

FIL European Luge Championships
FIL European Luge Championships
FIL European Luge Championships
Luge competitions in Russia
International sports competitions hosted by Russia
Sport in Moscow Oblast
European Luge Championships